DnaJ homolog subfamily C member 28 is a protein that in humans is encoded by the DNAJC28 gene. It's a member of chaperone DnaJ family. The family is also known as Hsp40 (heat shock protein 40 kDa).

References

External links

Further reading